Birk may refer to:

 Birk (market place), a demarcated area with its own laws and privileges, the Bjarkey laws
 Reykjavík Airport's ICAO code "BIRK"
 Birk (name), a given name and surname
 Birk, the German name for Petelea Commune, Mureș County, Romania

See also

 
 
 Birks (disambiguation)
 Berk (disambiguation)
 Burk (disambiguation)